This is a list of Clyde Football Club seasons up to the present day. The list details Clyde's record in major league and cup competitions, and the club's top league goal scorer of each season. Top scorers in bold were also the top scorers in Clyde's division that season. Records of regular minor competitions such as the Glasgow Cup are only included for seasons where the club reached a final.

Summary
Founded in 1877, Clyde's most notable achievements were three Scottish Cup victories in 1938–39, 1954–55 and 1957–58. They also reached the final of the competition on three other occasions. The club's highest league finish was 3rd in 1908–09, 1911–12 and 1966–67; after the latter campaign, they were denied entry to the 1967–68 Inter-Cities Fairs Cup as Rangers finished above them and were given the single Fairs Cup place for Glasgow, with only one team per city being allowed to enter under the rules of the time; the Bully Wee thus never played in Europe, with their Scottish Cup wins coming before the inception of the European Cup Winners' Cup.

Having spent much of their history in Scotland's top level (although something of a 'yo-yo club' with several relegations and promotions), their most recent participation in the top tier – when the Scottish League had just two large divisions and the club was based in Rutherglen – was in 1974–75, the final season of that setup; they immediately dropped down into the new third tier, and thereafter consolidated as one of the clubs who went up and down between the second and third levels regularly. After moving to a new stadium in Cumbernauld in 1994 (having spent eight seasons playing as tenants of other clubs), Clyde came close to gaining promotion to the Scottish Premier League several times in the early 2000s before dropping back down the divisions.

Seasons
Key

 P = Played
 W = Games won
 D = Games drawn
 L = Games lost
 F = Goals for
 A = Goals against
 Pts = Points
 Pos = Final position

 R1 = Round 1
 R2 = Round 2
 R3 = Round 3
 R4 = Round 4
 QF = Quarter-finals
 SF = Semi-finals
 SFL 1 = Scottish First Division
 SFL 2 = Scottish Second Division
 SFL 3 = Scottish Third Division

No league football (1877–1891)

Scottish Football League (1891–1939)

War-time League (1939–1946)

Scottish Football League (1946–1990)

Scottish Football League (1990–2013)

Scottish Professional Football League (2013–)

Notes

League performance summary 
The Scottish Football League was founded in 1890 and, other than during seven years of hiatus during World War II, the national top division has been played every season since. The following is a summary of Clyde's divisional status:

123 total eligible seasons (including 2019–20)
63 seasons in top level
36 seasons in second level
14 seasons in third level
9 seasons in fourth level
1 season not involved – before club was league member

References

External links
Soccerbase
FitbaStats
Football Club History Database

Seasons
 
Clyde
Seasons